Nana Mansinh Chudasama (17 June 1933 – 23 December 2018) was an eminent jurist and mayor and Sheriff of Mumbai.

Early life and family 
He was from a noted family Rajput of the Dholera, Dist. Ahmedabad, Gujarat. His father, Mansinh Chudasama, was police commissioner. Nana was second of three brothers, his elder brother the late Mota Chudasama being a noted businessman, and his younger brother Chhota being associated with Air India for many years.  Nana after graduation started his career in the early 1950s as an executive in a US petroleum company in Mumbai; he also managed an apartment at Prithviraj Chambers, on Narayan Dabholkar Road in the elite Nepean Sea Road area, next door to where he lived at the time.

Career 
In his later career, Nana became the founder of the NGO Giants International which has over 500 branches in India and branches across the world including the United States, United Kingdom, South Africa, Mauritius and Ukraine. Giants undertakes projects which affect society, such as family welfare, disaster management, education, environment and so on.

Chudasama was also the president of "I Love Mumbai" which he founded when he was Sheriff of Mumbai. The organization focuses on the greening, beautification and cleaning of Mumbai. He was also the President of Forum Against Drugs and AIDS which he founded, chairperson of the National Kidney Foundation, Founder President of Common Man's Forum, an organization to safeguard the interests of the common man; Convener, Relief and Rehabilitation Committee, Government of Maharashtra, which assists bomb blast victims. He was also the national president of Jaycees, which had earlier awarded him the Young Man of India Award; former president of Indo-American Society. He was also a member of the Task Force of the Government of Maharashtra to prepare action plan for transforming Mumbai into a better city.
He was also conferred the prestigious Padma Shri award for his social work.

Death 
He died on 23 December 2018 at the age of 85 after a brief illness. Shaina Nana Chudasama BJP's spokesperson is his daughter. Nana Chudasama and Munira Chudasama also have one son, Akshay Nana Chudasama, and another daughter, Brinda Nana Chudasama. His children were saddened by his death.

References

External links

 

1933 births
2018 deaths
Sheriffs of Mumbai
People from Rajkot district
Indian Hindus
Mayors of Mumbai
Maharashtra politicians
Recipients of the Padma Shri in social work
20th-century Indian lawyers
20th-century Indian educational theorists